Mosaad Awad Salama (born January 15, 1993 in Ismailia) is a football goalkeeper from Egypt plays for Wadi Degla of Egypt.

He was a member of Egypt U-20 national team participating in 2013 FIFA U-20 World Cup.

Club career
Awad started his career playing for Ismaily and Al-Ahly. Later on, he played for Smouha, Tala'ea El Gaish, Haras El Hodoud and Aswan. In October 2020, he signed for Wadi Degla.

International career
He made his debut with Egypt in a friendly against Uganda on 14 August 2013 under Bob Bradley. He made the bench on the 2014 World Cup qualifier match against Guinea on 15 September 2013.

References

External links
 
 

1993 births
Egyptian footballers
Living people
People from Ismailia
Egypt international footballers
2015 Africa U-23 Cup of Nations players
Al Ahly SC players
Egyptian Premier League players
Association football goalkeepers
Ismaily SC players
Smouha SC players
Tala'ea El Gaish SC players
Haras El Hodoud SC players
Aswan SC players
Wadi Degla SC players